Tunisia, participated at the 2015 African Games held in the city of Brazzaville, Republic of the Congo. She participates with 111 athletes in 14 sports besides paralympics games.

Medal summary

Medal table

Beach volleyball

Cycling

Karate

Women

Judo

Men

Women

Table tennis

Gymnastics

Weightlifting

Men

Taekwondo

Fencing

Men

Women

Boxing

Men

Women

Swimming

Men

Women

Athletics

Men

Women

Wrestling

Tennis

Disabled sports

Men

Women

References

Nations at the 2015 African Games
2015
All-Africa Games